The Lefevre Gallery (or The Lefevre Galleries) was an art gallery in London, England, operated by Alex. Reid & Lefevre Ltd.

The gallery was opened at 1a, King Street, St James's, in 1926, when rival art dealers Alexander Reid and Ernest Lefevre joined forces.

Upon Reid's death in 1928, his son, A J McNeill Reid succeeded him. Lefevre resigned in 1931.

In 1950, the gallery relocated to premises at 30, Bruton Street, Mayfair.

Among artists whose first British solo exhibitions were hosted by the gallery were Salvador Dalí, Edgar Degas, André Derain, L. S. Lowry, Amedeo Modigliani, Henri Rousseau, Gregorio Prieto and Georges Seurat, It also held the first London exhibitions for Bernard Buffet, Balthus and René Magritte. Others who exhibited there included Francis Bacon, Lucian Freud, Walter Sickert, Wyndham Lewis, and the East London Group.

The name lives on as 'Lefevre Fine Art' founded the same year.

References 

Art galleries in London
Art galleries established in 1928
Art galleries disestablished in 2002
St James's
Mayfair